Chitrakoot may refer to:

 Chitrakoot, Madhya Pradesh, a municipality in Madhya Pradesh, India
 Chitrakoot, Madhya Pradesh Assembly constituency, Madhya Pradesh
 Chitrakoot division, a division in Uttar Pradesh, India
 Chitrakoot district
 Chitrakoot Dham (Karwi), district headquarters 
 Chitrakoot Airport
 Chitrakoot Falls, a waterfall on the Indravati River, Chhattisgarh, India
 Chitrakoot Colony, a neighbourhood in west Jaipur, Rajasthan, India
 Chitrakoot Express, a mail/express train of Indian Railways
 Chittor Fort (formerly Chitrakut(a)), Rajasthan